Ping is a Chinese given name borne by (in chronological order):

Ancient China:
 King Ping of Zhou (died 720 BC), Chinese king
 Duke Ping of Jin (died 532 BC), ruler of Jin
 Duke Ping of Cao (died 524 BC), ruler of Cáo
 King Ping of Chu (died 516 BC), king of Chu
 Duke Ping of Qi (died 456 BC), titular ruler of Qi
 Chen Ping (Han Dynasty) (died 178 BC), chancellor to Emperor Gaozu
 Prince Ping of Liang (r. 137–97 BC)
 Emperor Ping of Han (9 BC–AD 6), Chinese emperor
 Xin Ping (died 204), a minister under the warlord Han Fu
 Guan Ping (died 219), general serving the warlord Liu Bei
 Wen Ping, third century general under the warlord Cao Cao
 Wang Ping (Three Kingdoms) (died 248), officer under Liu Bei, made a major general after defecting to Shu Han
 Murong Ping, fourth century regent of the Chinese state of Former Yan
 Xue Ping (753?-832), general of the Tang Dynasty

Other:
 Ping Bodie (born 1887-1961), American baseball athlete
 Ping Bodie (American football) (born 1896-1981), American football player
 Ping Chong (born 1946), American contemporary theater director, choreographer, writer and artist 
 Ping Duenas (born 1930-2009), Guamanian politician
 Ping Exciminiano (born 1988), Filipino basketball player
 Ping Fu (born 1958), American computer scientist, entrepreneur and author
 Ping Hsin-tao (born 1927), Taiwanese publisher
 Ping Lacson (born 1948), Filipino politician
 He Ping (born 1957), Chinese film director
 Hsin Ping (1938-1995), Chinese Buddhist abbot
 Lang Ping (born 1960), former Chinese volleyball player and former head coach of the United States women's national volleyball team
 Luo Ping (1733-1733), Chinese painter
 Song Ping (born 1917), Communist Chinese politician and governor
 Zhang Ping (politician) (born 1946), Chinese politician
 Zhang Ping (volleyball) (born 1982), Chinese volleyball player
 Wang Ping (author), Chinese-American author and academic

Chinese given names